Charlo can refer to:

Municipalities
Charlo, Montana
Charlo, New Brunswick

People
Charlo (name)

Other
Charlo station, Canadian rail station in Charlo, New Brunswick
Charlo Airport, Canadian airport in Charlo, New Brunswick
SoGK Charlo, Swedish sports club

See also

Charlos (disambiguation)
Charo (disambiguation)